In Stereo may refer to:

 In Stereo (Bomfunk MC's album), 1999
 In Stereo (Bananarama album)
 In Stereo (band), Australian boy band
 In Stereo (Clouseau album), 1999 album by Clouseau
 In Stereo (film), 2015 film
 In Stereo (EP), 2011 EP by Cartel
 "In Stereo", a song by Fort Minor from the 2005 album The Rising Tied